Theodoric II was the king of the Visigoths from 453 to 466.

Theodoric II (or Theoderic II, in French Thierry II) may also refer to:

Theuderic II, Frankish king of Burgundy (595–613) and Austrasia (612–613)
Theodoric II, Margrave of Lower Lusatia (1032–1034)
Theodoric II, Duke of Lorraine (1070–1115)
Theodoric II, Count of Montbéliard (1105–1163)
Theoderich von Wied, Theodoric II as archbishop of Trier (1212–1242)

See also
Theodoric, other persons with the name
Dietrich II (disambiguation), the German form of the name
Dirk II (disambiguation), the Dutch form of the name